Kesavan Venugopal (22 May 1948 – 11 October 2021), better known by his stage name Nedumudi Venu, was an Indian actor and screenwriter from Kerala, who predominantly worked in Malayalam cinema. He acted in more than 500 films, primarily in Malayalam and also in Tamil in a career spanning nearly five decades.
He wrote screenplays and directed one film. Nedumudi Venu won three National Film Awards and six Kerala State Film Awards for his various performances.

Early life
Venu was born as Venugopal to P. K. Kesava Pillai, a school master and P. Kunjikkuttiyamma in Nedumudi as the youngest of their five children. He had four elder brothers. He had his primary education from NSS Higher Secondary School, Nedumudi, and St. Mary's Higher Secondary School, Champakulam.

Venu was married to T. R. Susheela. The couple had two sons: Unni and Kannan.

Death
Venu died at KIMS Hospital in Thiruvananthapuram on 11 October 2021, at the age of 73. He was receiving treatment for liver cancer prior to his death and died from post COVID-19 complications. He also had diabetes, which complicated his condition. He was cremated with full state honours at Santhikavadam Crematorium in Thiruvananthapuram on 12 October 2021.

Filmography

Awards

National Film Awards 
 1990 – Best Supporting Actor – His Highness Abdullah
 2003 – Special Mention – Margam
 2006  – National Film Award for Best Non-Feature Film Narration / Voice Over – Minukku

Kerala State Film Awards 
 1980 – Second Best Actor – Chamaram
 1981 – Best Actor – Vida Parayum Munpe
 1987 – Best Actor – Oru Minnaminunginte Nurunguvettam
 1990 – Special Jury Award – Bharatham, Santhwanam
 1994 – Second Best Actor – Thenmavin Kombath
 2003 – Best Actor – Margam

Kerala State Television Awards 
 2001 - Best Actor : Avasthatarangal

Asianet Film Awards 
 2005 – Best Supporting Actor Award – Thanmatra
 2007 – Best Script Writer Award – Thaniye
 2011 – Best Supporting Actor – Best Actor, Elsamma Enna Aankutty
 2013 – Best Character Actor – North 24 Kaatham
 2015 – Best Villain – Oru Second Class Yathra, Rudra Simhasanam
 2017 – Asianet Film Award for Lifetime Achievement

Vanitha Film Awards 
2015 – Best Actor In A Negative Role – Oru Second Class Yatra

Filmfare Awards 
 1981 – Filmfare Award for Best Actor – Malayalam – Vida Parayum Munpe
 1987 – Filmfare Award for Best Actor – Malayalam -Oru Minnaminunginte Nurunguvettam
 1997 – Lifetime Achievement Award

Kerala Film Critics Association Awards 
 2007 – Second Best Actor – Thaniye
 2007 – Lifetime Achievement Award/Prathibha Puraskaram

Other awards 
 2003 – Best Actor Award won in Television Gallup Poll conducted by University of Kerala union for Ragardram (Doordarshan)
 2006 – Sathyan Award
 2006 – Kalavedi International Prathibha Award was presented at Tagore Theatre, Trivandrum in 2006.
 2007 – Bahadoor Award
 2008 – Kala Ratnam Award of KALA Abu Dhabi
 2011 – Serve India Media Award
 2015 – Vanitha Film Award for Best Villain for Oru Second Class Yathra and Rudra Simhasanam
 2007 – Saira – Best Actor award at the Zimbabwe International Film Festival

References

External links

 
 Nedumudi Venu at MSI

1948 births
2021 deaths
Indian male film actors
Male actors from Alappuzha
Kerala State Film Award winners
Male actors in Malayalam cinema
Tamil male actors
Filmfare Awards South winners
Best Supporting Actor National Film Award winners
20th-century Indian male actors
21st-century Indian male actors
Malayalam film directors
Malayalam screenwriters
Film directors from Kerala
Indian male television actors
Male actors in Hindi cinema
Screenwriters from Kerala
Special Mention (feature film) National Film Award winners
People from Alappuzha district
Deaths from the COVID-19 pandemic in India